Mount Murchison is a  mountain summit located at the convergence of the North Saskatchewan River valley and Mistaya River valley of Banff National Park, in the Canadian Rockies of Alberta, Canada. The main summit has two high points: the Southeast Peak is 3,353 m, whereas the Northwest Peak is 3,333 m and separated by 700 m distance. Its nearest higher peak is Mount Cline,  to the north. Mount Murchison is situated immediately southeast of the confluence of the North Saskatchewan River, Mistaya River, and Howse River near Saskatchewan Crossing, where the Icefields Parkway intersects with the David Thompson Highway.

History

Named by James Hector as he traversed the Mistaya Valley in September of 1858, Mount Murchison honors Sir Roderick Impey Murchison (1792-1871), a prominent English geologist and director of the Geological Survey of Great Britain. The mountain's name became official in 1924. The first ascent of the Northwest Peak was in 1902 by Norman Collie, H.E.M. Stutfield, G.M. Weed, and Hans Kaufmann. The first ascent of the Southeast Peak was made August 25, 1996, by Reg Bonney, Rick Collier, John Holmes, and Jerre Skvaril.

Geology

Like other mountains in Banff Park, the Murchison massif is composed of sedimentary rock laid down during the Precambrian to Jurassic periods. Formed in shallow seas, this sedimentary rock was pushed east and over the top of younger rock during the Laramide orogeny. The massif, which covers an area measuring five km by seven km (7400 acres), is characterized by seven rocky towers and glacial ice of the Murchison Icefield.

Towers of Murchison

Climate
Based on the Köppen climate classification, Mount Murchison is located in a subarctic climate with cold, snowy winters, and mild summers. Temperatures can drop below -20 °C with wind chill factors below -30 °C. Weather conditions during winter make Mount Murchison a destination in the Rockies for ice climbing. Precipitation runoff from Mount Murchison drains into tributaries of the Saskatchewan River.

Ice Climbing Routes
Ice Climbing Routes with grades on Mount Murchison

 But My Daddy's a Psycho - WI5
 Murchison Falls  - WI4-5
 Virtual Reality - WI6
 Balfour Wall - WI 2-4
 Cosmic Messenger - WI5
 Imaginary Voyage - WI3
 Laughter in the Dark - WI4
 Alien Abduction - WI5
 Syndrome - WI6

Gallery

See also

List of mountains of Canada
Geography of Alberta

References

External links
 Weather forecast: Mount Murchison
 Parks Canada web site: Banff National Park
 Explor8ion web site: Mount Murchison climb
 SummitSearch photo: Mount Murchison

Three-thousanders of Alberta
Mountains of Banff National Park
Canadian Rockies
Alberta's Rockies